Financial Supervisory Commission may refer to:
Financial Supervisory Commission (Taiwan)
Financial Supervisory Commission (South Korea)